Mike van de Meulenhof (born 11 May 1999) is a Dutch professional footballer who plays as goalkeeper.

International career
He was the starting goalkeeper for Netherlands at the 2016 UEFA European Under-17 Championship, in which they reached the semi-final.

References

1999 births
Living people
Sportspeople from Helmond
Footballers from North Brabant
Association football goalkeepers
Dutch footballers
Netherlands youth international footballers
Jong PSV players
Eerste Divisie players